Teresa Gimpera Flaquer (born 21 September 1936) is a Spanish film and television actress and former model of the 60s and 70s.

Biography
Teresa Gimpera Flaquer was born in Igualada, province of Barcelona, on 21 September 1936. Her parents were both teachers, and grew up in the Sant Andreu neighbourhood of Barcelona.

Her first job was with Leopoldo Pomes as an advertisement model. She later made her film debut in Fata Morgana (1965). She went on to star in numerous films throughout the 1960s and 1970s.

She married Octavio Sarsanedas, who worked in advertising at the Seix Barral publishing house. They had three children, Marc, Job, and Joan.

In 1990 she married U.S. actor Craig Hill; he had moved to Barcelona, Spain where he had found work in Spaghetti Westerns. They were married for 24 years until Hill's death in April 2014.

Selected filmography
Lucky, the Inscrutable (1966)
 Black Box Affair (1966)
 Wanted (1967)
 Tuset Street (1968)
 El extraño caso del doctor Fausto (1969)
 Eagles Over London (1969)
 The Exquisite Cadaver (1969)
 Twenty Thousand Dollars for Seven (1969)
 The Legend of Frenchie King (1971)
 The Rebellious Novice (1971)
 Naked Girl Killed in the Park (1972)
 The Night of the Devils (1972)
 Hannah, Queen of the Vampires (1973)
 Those Dirty Dogs (1973)
 The Spirit of the Beehive (1973)
 El vicio y la virtud (1975)
 English Striptease (1975)
 Course Completed (1987)
 The Long Winter (1992)

References

Bibliography
 Mira, Alberto. The Cinema of Spain and Portugal. Wallflower Press, 2005.

External links

1936 births
Living people
Spanish film actresses
Spanish female models
Spanish television actresses
People from Barcelona